The Key System (or Key Route) was a privately owned company that provided mass transit in the cities of Oakland, Berkeley, Alameda, Emeryville, Piedmont, San Leandro, Richmond, Albany, and El Cerrito in the eastern San Francisco Bay Area from 1903 until 1960, when it was sold to a newly formed public agency, AC Transit. The Key System consisted of local streetcar and bus lines in the East Bay, and commuter rail and bus lines connecting the East Bay to San Francisco by a ferry pier on San Francisco Bay, later via the lower deck of the Bay Bridge. The local streetcars were discontinued in 1948 and the commuter trains to San Francisco were discontinued in 1958. The Key System's territory is today served by BART and AC Transit bus service.

History

Early years 

The system was a consolidation of several streetcar lines assembled in the late 1890s and early 1900s by Francis Marion "Borax" Smith. After having made a fortune in Borax and gained his nickname, "Borax", the entrepreneur turned to real estate and electric traction for streetcars. The Key System was founded as the San Francisco, Oakland, and San Jose Railway (SFOSJR), incorporated in 1902. Service began on October 26, 1903, with a four-car train carrying 250 passengers, departing downtown Berkeley for the ferry pier, with service to San Francisco. Before the end of 1903, the general manager of the SFOSJR devised the idea of using a stylized map on which the system's routes resembled an old-fashioned key, with three "handle loops" that covered the cities of Berkeley, Piedmont (initially, "Claremont" shared the Piedmont loop) and Oakland, and a "shaft" in the form of the Key pier, the "teeth" representing the ferry berths at the end of the pier. The company touted its 'key route', which led to the adoption of the name "Key System".

In 1908, the SFOSJR changed its name to the San Francisco, Oakland & San Jose Consolidated Railway; it changed to the San Francisco-Oakland Terminal Railway in 1912. After it went bankrupt in December 1923, it was re-organized as the Key System Transit Co., adopting a marketing concept as the name of the company.

Following the Great Crash of 1929, a holding company called the Railway Equipment & Realty Co. was created, with the subsidiary Key System Ltd running the commuter trains. In 1938, the name became the Key System.

During World War II, the Key System built and operated the Shipyard Railway between a transfer station in Emeryville and the Kaiser Shipyards in Richmond.

National City Lines era 

National City Lines acquired 64% of the stock in the system in 1946.

The same year E. Jay Quinby hand published a document exposing the ownership of National City Lines (General Motors, Firestone Tire, and Phillips Petroleum). He addressed the publication to The Mayors; The City Manager; The City Transit Engineer; The members of The Committee on Mass-Transportation and The Tax-Payers and The Riding Citizens of Your Community. In it he wrote "This is an urgent warning to each and every one of you that there is a careful, deliberately planned campaign to swindle you out of your most important and valuable public utilities–your Electric Railway System".

The new owners made a number of rapid changes. In 1946 they cut back the A-1 train route and then the express trains in 1947. The company increased fares in 1946 and then in both January and November 1947. During the period there were many complaints of overcrowding.

On April 9, 1947, nine corporations and seven individuals (constituting officers and directors of certain of the corporate defendants) were indicted in the Federal District Court of Southern California on two counts: 'conspiring to acquire control of a number of transit companies, forming a transportation monopoly' and 'Conspiring to monopolize sales of buses and supplies to companies owned by National City Lines'. They were convicted of conspiring to monopolize sales of buses and supplies. They were acquitted of conspiring to monopolize the ownership of these companies.

In 1948 National City Lines proposed a plan to convert all the streetcars to buses. They placed an advertisement in the local papers explaining their plan to 'modernize' and 'motorize' Line 14. The Oakland City Council opposed the plan by 5–3. The Public Utilities Commission (PUC) supported the plan which included large fare increases. In October 1948, 700 people signed a petition with the PUC "against the Key System, seeking restoration of the bus service on the #70 Chabot Bus line". The city councils of Oakland, Berkeley and San Leandro opposed the removal of street cars. The traffic planners supported removal of the streetcar lines to facilitate movement of automobiles. Local governments in the East Bay attempted to purchase the Key System, but were unsuccessful.

Streetcars were converted to buses during November/December 1948.

In 1949 National City Lines, General Motors and others were convicted of conspiring to monopolize the sale of buses and related products to their subsidiary transit companies throughout the U.S.

Between 1946 and 1954 transbay fares increased from 20¢ to 50¢ ($ to $ adjusted for inflation). Fares in this period were used to operate and for 'motorisation' which included streetcar track removal, repaving, purchase of new buses and the construction of bus maintenance facilities. Transbay ridership fell from 22.2 million in 1946 to 9.8 million in 1952.

The Key System's famed commuter train system was dismantled in 1958 after many years of declining ridership as well by the corrupt monopolistic efforts of National City Lines. The last run was on April 20, 1958. In 1960, the newly formed publicly owned AC Transit took over the Key System's facilities.

Most of the rolling stock was scrapped, with some sold to Buenos Aires, Argentina. Several streetcars, interurbans and bridge units were salvaged for collections in the United States.  Of the large bridge units, three are at the Western Railway Museum near Rio Vista, California while another is at the Orange Empire Railway Museum in southern California.

System details 

The initial connection across the Bay to San Francisco was by ferryboat via a causeway and pier ("mole"), extending from the end of Yerba Buena Avenue in Oakland, California, westward 16,000 feet (4,900 m) to a ferry terminal near Yerba Buena Island. Filling for the causeway had been started by a short-lived narrow-gauge railroad company in the late 19th century, the California and Nevada Railroad. "Borax" Smith acquired the causeway from the California and Nevada upon its bankruptcy.

On May 6, 1933, a major fire erupted on the pier end of the mole, consuming the ferry terminal building as well as gutting the ferryboat  Peralta.  The pier was subsequently reconstructed and a new terminal building erected.

The Key System operated a fleet of ferries between the Key Route Pier and the San Francisco Ferry Building until January 15, 1939, when a new dual track opened on the south side of the lower deck of the San Francisco–Oakland Bay Bridge, bringing Key System trains to the then-new Transbay Terminal in San Francisco's downtown. The bridge railway and Transbay Terminal were shared with the Southern Pacific's Interurban Electric and the Western Pacific's Sacramento Northern railroads.

The Key System's first trains were composed of standard wooden railroad passenger cars, complete with clerestory roofs. Atop each of these, a pair of pantographs, invented and manufactured by the Key System's own shops, were installed to collect current from overhead wires to power a pair of electric motors on each car, one on each truck (bogie).

The design of rolling stock changed over the years. Wood gave way to steel, and, instead of doors at each end, center doors were adopted.

The later rolling stock consisted of specially designed "bridge units" for use on the new bridge, articulated cars sharing a common central truck and including central passenger entries in each car, a forerunner of the design of most light rail vehicles today. Several of these pairs were connected to make up a train. Power pickup was via pantograph from overhead catenary wires, except on the Bay Bridge where a third rail pickup was used. The Key's trains ran on 600 volt direct current, compared to the 1200 volts used by the SP commuter trains. The cars had an enclosed operator's cab in the right front, with passenger seats extending to the very front of the vehicle, a favorite seat for many children, with dramatic views of the tracks ahead.

The exterior color of the cars was orange and silver. Interior upholstery was woven reed seat covers in one of the articulated sections, and leather in the other, the smoking section. The flooring was linoleum. During WWII, the roofs were painted gray for aerial camouflage. After acquisition by National City Lines, all Key vehicles including the bridge units were re-painted in that company's standard colors, yellow and green.

Transbay rail lines 

Until the Bay Bridge railway began operation, Key commuter trains had no letter designation. They were named for the principal street or district they served.

D was reserved for a proposed line into Montclair alongside the Sacramento Northern interurban railway

The A, B, C, E and F lines were the last Key System rail lines. Train service ended on April 20, 1958, replaced by buses using the same letter designations. AC Transit preserved the letter-designated routes when it took over the Key System two years later, and are still in use; AC Transit's B, C, E, F, G and H lines follow roughly the corresponding Key routes and neighborhoods.

East Bay Street railways 

The Key System's streetcars operated as a separate division under the name "Oakland Traction Company", later changed to "East Bay Street Railways. Ltd", and finally to "East Bay Transit Co.", reflecting the increasing use of buses. The numbering of the streetcar lines changed several times over the years. The Key System's streetcars operated out of several carbarns. The Central Carhouse was on the east side of Lake Merritt on Third Avenue. The Western Carhouse was located at 51st and Telegraph Avenue in the Temescal District of Oakland. The Elmhurst Carhouse was in the east Oakland district of Elmhurst, on East 14th (International Blvd.) between 94th and 96th Avenues. The Northern Carhouse was in Richmond where today's AC Transit has a bus yard.  In the early years of operation, these were supplemented by a number of smaller carbarns scattered throughout the East Bay area, many of them inherited from the pre-Key companies acquired by "Borax" Smith. The Key streetcars were originally painted dark green and cream white, then orange.  They were re-painted in the green and yellow scheme of National City Lines after NCL acquired the Key System.

The Key System had ordered 40 trolley coaches from ACF-Brill in 1945 to convert the East Bay trolley lines. The new NCL management canceled the Key's trackless program in 1946 before wire changes were made, and diverted the order (some units of which had already been painted for the Key and delivered to Oakland) to its own Los Angeles Transit Lines, where they ran until 1963. The last Key streetcars ran on November 28, 1948, replaced by buses.

Related rail systems 
The Key System organized its freight business in 1929 as the Key Terminal Railway, Ltd. In 1938, the name was changed to the Oakland Terminal Railroad, Ltd. In 1943 the Oakland Terminal Railroad was jointly purchased by the Western Pacific Railroad and the Atchison, Topeka and Santa Fe Railway and is now known as the Oakland Terminal Railway.
The Eastshore and Suburban Railway (E&SR) was a formerly independent unit of the Key System which ran streetcar trains in Richmond, San Pablo, and El Cerrito. Service to Oakland required a transfer to Oakland Traction Company trains at the County Line station and service to San Francisco required an additional transfer.
See also the East Bay Electric Lines; another transbay commuter rail system operated by the Southern Pacific in the East Bay until 1941.
See also the Sacramento Northern Railroad, an interurban system running from Chico through Sacramento to Oakland which also used some of the Key System's trackage as well as the Key System's ferry pier, and later ran to the Transbay Terminal until 1941.

Other properties 
From the beginning, the Key System had been conceived as a dual real estate and transportation system. "Borax" Smith and his partner Frank C. Havens first established a company called the "Realty Syndicate" which acquired large tracts of undeveloped land throughout the East Bay. The Realty Syndicate also built two large hotels, each served by a San Francisco-bound train, the Claremont and the Key Route Inn, and a popular amusement park in Oakland called Idora Park. Streetcar lines were also routed to serve all these properties, thereby enhancing their value. In its early years, the Key System was actually a subsidiary of the Realty Syndicate.  Berkeley's numerous paths, lanes, walks and steps, were put in place in many of the newly developed neighborhoods, often in the middle of a city block, so that commuters could walk more directly to the new train system. Berkeley's pathways are still maintained by local groups.

Legacy 

Signs of the system still remain:

The south wall of the lower level (today's eastbound lanes) of the Yerba Buena Tunnel, connecting the two spans of the Bay Bridge, still contains the as-built "deadman holes", regularly spaced refuge bays into which railway workers could duck whenever a train came along.
The eastern end of the San Francisco–Oakland Bay Bridge sits on landfill which was added to the northern edge of the causeway which carried the Key System railbed to the ferry piers.
The tunnel that Key System trains used to cross under the Southern Pacific (now Union Pacific and Amtrak) tracks to the mole and later the Bay Bridge still exists. It is visible from the Alexander Zuckerman Bike Path, the ramps of the Macarthur Maze, and at the southwest end of the Target store property in Emeryville, a locale that was once part of the Key System yards and shops.
A stretch of road in Albany that was built with a wide median for a planned extension (never constructed) of the "G" Westbrae line is named Key Route Boulevard.
The Claremont Hotel, built by a Key System affiliate company, The Realty Syndicate, survives as the Claremont Resort.  It was the terminus of the "E" transbay line.
The Realty Syndicate Building at 1440 Broadway was built in 1912 and housed "Borax" Smith and Frank C. Havens's Realty Syndicate that created the Key System. It is listed on the National Historic Register.
The Key System's subsequent administrative headquarters building, built as the Security Bank and Trust Company Building in 1914, still exists at 1100 Broadway in downtown Oakland and is listed on the National Register of Historic Places. The building suffered some damage in the 1989 Loma Prieta earthquake and is as of June 2020 unoccupied, although there are plans for the building to be rehabilitated by a developer constructing a larger new building adjacent to it.
A building which has been converted for restaurant use at 41st Street and Piedmont Avenue in Oakland is the partial remnant of what was formerly a covered stop for trains on the C-line. (The tracks followed 40th Street, crossed Howe Street and curved through the parking lot behind Piedmont Avenue shops, then merged onto Piedmont Avenue at 41st Street and headed toward Pleasant Valley Avenue.) Old photos of the Key System are on the walls of the restaurant, as well as a mural of Key System images on one of its outside walls. In December 2014, the mural was partially destroyed during renovation of the building. This act, apparently done swiftly and without public notice, has stirred considerable controversy 
The old Key System Piedmont shops building at Bay Place and Harrison is now a Whole Foods Market retail store. This building was originally built in 1890 as the powerhouse and car barn of the Piedmont Cable Car Co. In the 1920s, it was substantially remodeled and used as a Cadillac showroom which closed in the mid-1990s. The building sat vacant until 2003, when Whole Foods initiated a radical interior redesign while retaining and restoring much of the facade.
The bus yards of today's AC Transit in Emeryville and Richmond were originally the bus yards of the Key System.  The Richmond yard was also previously the site of the Northern Carhouse of the Key streetcar system.
Several streetcars and bridge trains from the Key System are preserved at the Western Railway Museum at Rio Vista Junction in Solano County, as well as a Bridge Unit at the Southern California Railway Museum in Perris, California and a streetcar at Seashore Trolley Museum in Kennebunk, Maine.
One of the 0-4-0 Steam locomotives used to push the trains during power outages is on display at the Redwood Valley Railway. It had a brief stint on the currently re-constructing Virginia and Truckee Railroad in Virginia City, Nevada. Here, the mountain grades proved too taxing for the little locomotive. It was later replaced by 2–8–0 Steam locomotive No. 29.
Although built by the Southern Pacific Railroad, the Key System inherited the Northbrae Tunnel right-of-way, which it operated from 1942 through 1958. It was converted to street use and opened to auto traffic on December 15, 1962.
Located at the former Oakland Army Base site, The Interurban Electric Railway Bridge Yard Shop Building, was used as a maintenance facility for the Key System electric trains. Today, the building is now known as the Bridge Yard Building and is used as a venue for events. A substation located at the site also provided electrical power to all the Key System trains.
The site of the Interurban Electric Railway Bridge Yard Shop Building, as well as former Oakland Army Base, is now the Judge John Sutter Regional Shoreline park. The park opened on October 21, 2020, and is located at the foot of the Bay Bridge.

See also 
 Ferries of San Francisco Bay

References

Bibliography

External links 

General
Archive.org, The Key System presents: The March of Progress (1945 documentary)
 Snowcrest.net, Stills from the documentary
Oberail.org, Oakland Berkeley & Eastern
OaklandWiki.org, OaklandWiki – Key System description and system maps
Historic American Engineering Record (HAER) documentation:

Pictures
1100 Broadway, Proposed redevelopment of former headquarters building
ModelSmith.com, "Key System #182 sitting in the car barn at the Western Railway Museum", September 1990
AlamedaInfo.com, A Key System bridge unit in Oakland, 1954
Bayarearailfan.org, A gallery of Key System images
Keyrailpix.org, image gallery
Museumca.org, Postcard: Key Route Pier
NYCsubway.org, Images
CDlib.org, Photo: Key System train on Key Mole adjacent to new Bay Bridge, 1936
Key System train on the ramp to the Bay Bridge from the Transbay Terminal in San Francisco, 1939, Dorothea Lange photo

Defunct California railroads
Electric railways in California
Interurban railways in California
Passenger rail transportation in California
Defunct public transport operators in the United States
Historic American Engineering Record in California
History of Oakland, California
History of Alameda County, California
History of Contra Costa County, California
Rail transportation in Oakland, California
Transportation companies based in California
History of San Francisco
Public transportation in Alameda County, California
Public transportation in Contra Costa County, California
Public transportation in San Francisco
1903 establishments in California
Defunct companies based in California